Irene Arcos (Madrid, July 25, 1981) is a Spanish actress known mainly for her roles in television series. She made her debut in Los hombres de Paco (2008). Since then, she has been in popular shows like Élite (2018-2020) and El embarcadero (2019-2020).

Biography 
Arcos was born on July 25, 1981 in Madrid (Spain). Most of her family comes from Galicia, specifically from La Coruña. She graduated in audiovisual communication at the Complutense University of Madrid. However, she later found her vocation as an actress and studied drama at the Centro de Estudio Recabarrem, an acting school located in Madrid. In addition, she also took a series of courses related to acting.

Professional career 
She began working as a camera assistant after finishing her degree in audiovisual communication at the Complutense University of Madrid, in the well-known series of Hospital Central, for Telecinco. However, during this experience, she knew that her vocation was to be an actress, and so she decided to study theater for three years. First, she interpreted plays of great importance, such as La caja, Troyanas, Trainspotting or 12 meses. Later, she participated in Spanish fiction as an episodic character. In 2011, she had a recurring role in the series Hispania, playing Navia. Although her fame has come as a result of the series Vis a Vis and Élite, when she first became known on the national stage.

In 2019, it was announced that she would play Verónica in the Movistar+ fiction El embarcadero, alongside Álvaro Morte y Verónica Sánchez. She later participated in La valla and Madres.Amor y vida. At the end of 2020, her leading role was announced for the Movistar+ series Todos mienten, where she plays Macarena, a teacher who is involved in a sex scandal when a video of her high-content together with a student comes to light.

Filmography

Cinema

Television

Theater

Awards and nominations

References

External links 
 Irene Arcos on IMDb

Spanish film actresses
Spanish television actresses
Living people
1981 births
21st-century Spanish actresses
Actresses from Madrid